Manly Rugby Union Football Club is a rugby union club based in Manly, a suburb of Sydney. The club was formed in 1883 and competes in the New South Wales Rugby Union competitions, the Charter Hall Shute Shield.

Manly, known as the Marlins, play their home games at Manly Oval and train at Keirle Park.

Manly Beaches and Manly Districts merged to form Manly RUFC. The District team's colours were chosen to represent to new club, whilst Beach's homeground, Manly Oval, was used for the merged club. 

Manly joined the first grade in 1906, but have roots back to 1883. The current club colours of red and blue came into being in the late 1900s. The club were a great force in the 1920s and 1930s. In 1950 Manly won both the first grade and reserve grade titles in the same season. However, there were no titles for over 30 years, until 1983, under coach Alan Jones, though the club, while playing entertaining running rugby, could not produce consistent results. In 1997 the club again won the first grade title. In 2006 Manly celebrated 100 years of rugby.

Honours 
Shute Shield Titles (1st Grade): 7 (1922, 1932, 1942, 1943, 1950, 1983, 1997)
Melrose Sevens Winners (1): 1995

Super Rugby representatives

 George Smith – Act Brumbies
 Tyrone Smith – ACT Brumbies
 Michael Hooper – NSW Waratahs
 Wycliff Palu – NSW Waratahs
 Chris Siale – Queensland Reds
 Andrew Smith – ACT Brumbies
 Eddie Aholelei – Melbourne Rebels
 Cadeyrn Neville – Melbourne Rebels
 Jono Owen – Melbourne Rebels
 Reece Hodge – Melbourne Rebels
 Lalakai Foketi – NSW Waratahs
 Dave Porecki – NSW Waratahs
 Max Douglas – NSW Waratahs
 Langi Gleeson – NSW Waratahs

Sponsors

 Mounties
 McPhee Transport
 ICMS
 ISCA
 Wahu
 Brookvale Mazda
 Hotel Steyne 
 Involved Media
 Integrated Project Group
 Freshwater Financial Services
 Paladin
 Manly Rugby Foundation 
 Budgy Smuggler
 Solatube
 Garfish 
 Innovative Print Solutions
 AVA Hire
 Piranha Golf 
 Kennards Hire
 Autotune Freshwater
 ID Fitouts
 Bergelin Estate Agents
 Modus
 Pine Property
 Fire Stopping
 Saintly

References

External links
 Official website

Rugby union teams in Sydney
Rugby clubs established in 1906
Manly, New South Wales
Northern Beaches
1906 establishments in Australia